Tyran Jamall "Ty" Walker (born August 7, 1989) is an American professional basketball player who currently plays for KW Titans of the NBL Canada.

Prep/High School Awards & Honors
North Carolina Gatorade Player of the Year – 2007, 2008
North Carolina Mr. Basketball – 2008

College statistics

|-
| style="text-align:left;"| 2008–09
| style="text-align:left;"| Wake Forest
| 11 || 0 || 3.8 || .357 || .000 || .000|| 1.09 ||0.09 || 0.18 ||0.36 || 0.91
|-
| style="text-align:left;"| 2009–10
| style="text-align:left;"| Wake Forest
| 8 || 0 || 6.0 || .312 || .000 || .714|| 1.38 ||0.12  || 0.25 || 1.12 || 1.88
|-
| style="text-align:left;"| 2010–11
| style="text-align:left;"| Wake Forest
| 32 || 9 || 18.1 || .453 || .000 || .559|| 3.50 ||0.44  || 0.56 || 2.47 || 3.59
|-
| style="text-align:left;"| 2011–12
| style="text-align:left;"| Wake Forest
| 20 || 14 || 19.9 || .481 || .000 || .800|| 4.55 ||0.60 || 0.35 || 2.60 || 4.20
|-
|- class="sortbottom"
! style="text-align:center;" colspan=2| Career
! 71 || 23 || 15.0 || .447 || .000 || .604 || 3.18 ||0.39 ||0.41 || 2.03 || 3.15

Playoffs

|-
| style="text-align:left;"| 2009–10
| style="text-align:left;"| Wake Forest
| 1 ||   || 8.0 || .000 || .000 || .750|| 1.0 ||0.0 || 1.0 ||3.0|| 3.0
|-

The Basketball Tournament
Ty Walker played for Team Wake The Nation in the 2018 edition of The Basketball Tournament. He had three points and three rebounds in the team's first-round loss to Team Showtime.

Career statistics

Regular season 

|-
| align="left" | 2012–13
| align="left" |Kołobrzeg/Limoges
|28||18||17.2||.500||.500||.562||5.54||0.93||0.46||2.11||4.61
|-
| align="left" | 2013–14
| align="left" | MNE/ERI
|43||19||21.7||.628||.000||.590||6.21||0.77||0.40||2.28||5.88
|-
|-
| align="left" | 2014–15
| align="left" | Akita
|30||14||20||56.7%||0.0%||46.2%||7.0||0.9||0.4||1.7||5.7
|-
| align="left" | 2014–15
| align="left" | RNO
|15||4||12.9||.655||.000||.375||3.13||0.53||0.47||1.53||2.73
|-
| align="left" | 2015–16
| align="left" | IWA
|11||8||22.4||.540||.000||.333||8.00||0.36||0.09||1.91||5.45
|-
| align="left" | 2015–16
| align="left" | Koszalin
|14||14||14.4||.515||.000||.600||4.64||0.29||0.29||1.79||3.07
|-
| align="left" | 2018–19
| align="left" | Windsor
|26||16||22.7||.626||.000||.552||6.08||1.08||0.38||2.23||5.77
|-

References

External links
Wake Forest Demon Deacons bio

1989 births
Living people
Akita Northern Happinets players
American expatriate basketball people in Chile
American expatriate basketball people in France
American expatriate basketball people in Hong Kong
American expatriate basketball people in Japan
American expatriate basketball people in Poland
AZS Koszalin players
Basketball players from North Carolina
Centers (basketball)
Erie BayHawks (2008–2017) players
Iowa Energy players
Limoges CSP players
Maine Red Claws players
Basketball players from Columbus, Ohio
Sportspeople from Wilmington, North Carolina
Wake Forest Demon Deacons men's basketball players
Windsor Express players
American men's basketball players